Stephen Lawrence John Conway (born 15 November 1974) is an English university manager and former first-class cricketer.

Conway was born at Stockton-on-Tees in November 1974. He studied chemistry at Jesus College, Oxford and completed a doctorate with Professor Malcolm Green. While at Oxford, he made a single appearance in first-class cricket for Oxford University against Essex at Chelmsford in 1999. Conway has held a number of senior roles in university management including at the University of Oxford and the Open University. He became a fellow of Jesus College, Oxford and in 2018 he was appointed to the post of executive director of Research Services at the University of Oxford.

References

External links

1974 births
Living people
Cricketers from Stockton-on-Tees
Alumni of Jesus College, Oxford
English cricketers
Oxford University cricketers
Fellows of Jesus College, Oxford